Deworski Odom (born April 11, 1977) is a former American sprinter who specialized in the 100 metres. As a 17-year-old, he won a bronze medal in the 100 metres at the 1994 World Junior Championships, surpassing Henry Thomas's World Youth Best over this distance.

Odom was born in Cordele, Georgia, to Lessie Odom, then 16. When he was 4 years old, he moved with family to Philadelphia. He began running as a sixth-grader at Shoemaker Middle School. He later attended Overbrook High School. In the 1995 National Scholastic Indoor Track and Field Championships in Syracuse, New York, Odom set three national records.

Although recruited by every major track program in the United States, Odom did not meet the academic requirements to attend college. He went to Wallace State Community College in Hanceville, Alabama, where his career derailed. He eventually attended St. Augustine's University in Raleigh, North Carolina, for one season before turning professional.

, Odom serves as track and field coach at his alma mater, Overbrook High School in Philadelphia.

References

External links
 

1977 births
Living people
People from Cordele, Georgia
Sportspeople from Georgia (U.S. state)
Track and field athletes from Philadelphia
American male sprinters
African-American male track and field athletes
21st-century African-American sportspeople
20th-century African-American sportspeople